The list of ship launches in 1909 includes a chronological list of some ships launched in 1909.

References

Sources
 

1909
Ship launches